Jersey Park Farm is a historic home and farm located in Greenville Township, Floyd County, Indiana.  The farmhouse was built about 1875, and consists of a two-story, Federal style rectangular section with a two-story round section and one-story round section.  It is built over a spring and features a wraparound porch.  Also on the property are a contributing barn and icehouse.

It was listed on the National Register of Historic Places in 1984.

References

Houses on the National Register of Historic Places in Indiana
Federal architecture in Indiana
Houses completed in 1875
Houses in Floyd County, Indiana
National Register of Historic Places in Floyd County, Indiana
1875 establishments in Indiana